Sheba is a southern kingdom mentioned in Biblical scriptures and the Qur'an.
Sheba may also refer to:

People 
 Sheba Chhachhi, Indian artist
 Sheba Deireragea (born 1986), Nauruan weightlifter
 Sheba Hargreaves, American writer
 Sheba Karim, American author

Religious and historical references
Saba (sura) (Arabic: Sheba), 34th sura of the Qur'an
Seba (biblical figure)
Sheba son of Bichri, a biblical character

Places
1196 Sheba, an asteroid
Saba, a Dutch Colony in Caribbean Island.

Arts, entertainment, and media

Fictional characters
Sheba (Golden Sun character)
Lieutenant Sheba, a character from Battlestar Galactica

Films
Sheba (film), a 1921 silent film
Come Back, Little Sheba (1952 film)
Sheba, Baby (1975), blaxploitation film starring Pam Grier and Austin Stoker.

Music
"Sheba" (song), a 1980 song by Mike Oldfield

Palaces
 Queen of Sheba's Palace (disambiguation)

Other uses
Sheba (cat food), a brand of cat food
HMS Sheba, a former Royal Navy base in Aden, Yemen
Sheba Medical Center, a hospital in Ramat Gan, Israel
ShebaMiles, Ethiopian Airlines' frequent flyer program
Surface Heat Budget of the Arctic Ocean (SHEBA), an acronym for a National Science Foundation-funded research project
 شيبة, sometimes spelled shiba, sheeba or chiba, the Moroccan Arabic word for the plant Artemisia arborescens used in the Maghrebi mint tea

See also
Chiba (disambiguation)
Queen of Sheba (disambiguation)
Shebaa Farms, a disputed area between Israel, Lebanon, and Syria 
Shiva
Shva (ְ), a vowel in the Hebrew language